Nandi Awards for the year 2012 was announced on 1 March 2017 by the Andhra Pradesh Government.

Winners list

See also
Nandi Awards of 2011

References

2012
2012 Indian film awards